Greece participated at the 2010 Winter Olympics in Vancouver, British Columbia, Canada.

Alpine skiing

Biathlon

Cross-country skiing

See also
 Greece at the Olympics
 Greece at the 2010 Winter Paralympics

References

External links
 Dimitriadis profile
 Athlete profiles - Greek

2010 in Greek sport
Nations at the 2010 Winter Olympics
2010